The National Broadcast Orchestra is a Canadian radio orchestra based in Vancouver, British Columbia.  Created after the CBC Radio Orchestra was disbanded in November, 2008, the National Broadcast Orchestra (NBO) was founded by conductor Alain Trudel and businessman Philippe Labelle.  It was incorporated in January, 2009 and was granted charitable status under the Canada Revenue Agency in July, 2009.

In its new form, the NBO reaches beyond the boundaries of traditional radio broadcasting, utilizing the Internet as its primary tool for connecting with audiences. The NBO is dedicated to presenting the work of Canadian composers and artists. Activities begin in the fall of 2009 with a pilot project in digital video recording at the Chan Centre.  The orchestra's first concert was performed on Saltspring Island, British Columbia, on September 16, 2009 and its official debut in its home venue, Vancouver's Chan Centre for the Performing Arts, took place on January 8, 2010.

References

Canadian orchestras
Radio and television orchestras
Musical groups established in 2009
Musical groups from Vancouver
2009 establishments in British Columbia